Blake M. Roney is the founder and former chairman of Nu Skin Enterprises. He founded the company in 1984 and is also a trustee of the Force for Good Foundation. He took leave from Nu Skin Enterprises in 2012 to serve as a Mission President for the LDS church in France.

References

External links
 

Living people
American businesspeople
American philanthropists
Brigham Young University alumni
1958 births